Mrs. Brown, You've Got a Lovely Daughter may refer to:
 Mrs. Brown, You've Got a Lovely Daughter, song
 Mrs. Brown, You've Got a Lovely Daughter (album), 1968 album by Herman's Hermits
 Mrs. Brown, You've Got a Lovely Daughter (EP), 1965 EP by Herman's Hermits
 Mrs. Brown, You've Got a Lovely Daughter (film), 1968 film featuring Herman's Hermits